Banewreaker is a fantasy novel by Jacqueline Carey. It is Carey's fourth novel and the first in The Sundering series. Banewreaker is set in Urulat, a world based on J. R. R. Tolkien's Middle-earth, and many of the plot points mirror The Lord of the Rings. The novel received mixed reaction, and has not achieved the popularity of the Kushiel's Legacy books.

Influences
Carey has acknowledged that the book is based around Tolkien's The Lord of the Rings, as well as the classical tragedy form, reversing the good versus evil scheme of Tolkien by telling the story as an "epic tragedy" from the perspective of the characters who are perceived by most of Urulat as "evil". Carey stated that "it departs from convention in one significant way, which is that it's sympathetic to the losing side, and over the course of the two volumes, the story emerges as one long, colossal tragedy." The novel begins with a quote from John Milton's "Paradise Lost".

References

External links
 

2004 American novels
American fantasy novels
Tor Books books